Birge may refer to

People
 Jean-Jacques Birgé (born 1952), French composer
 Jodle Birge (born 1945), Danish composer and singer
 John Birges (born 1922), Mastermind of Harvey's Resort Hotel bombing
 June Bingham Birge (born 1919), American author and playwright
 Birge Clark (born 1893), American architect
 Raymond Thayer Birge (born 1887), American physicist
 Edward Bailey Birge (born 1868), American music educator
 L. Birge Harrison (born 1854), American genre and landscape painter
 Edward Asahel Birge (born 1851), President of the University of Wisconsin
 Henry Warner Birge (born 1825), Union Army general during the American Civil War.
 Lucien Birgé (born 1950), French mathematician at the University Pierre et Marie Curie in Paris

Other
 Birge–Sponer method, A calculation method in molecular spectroscopy
 Birge-Horton House, Historic home in Buffalo, New York
 Birge Mills, Ontario, A community in Ontario, Canada